The 2019 Mont Ventoux Dénivelé Challenge was the first edition of the Mont Ventoux Dénivelé Challenge road cycling one day race. It was held on 17 June 2019 as part of the 2019 UCI Europe Tour in category 1.1.

Teams
Twelve teams participated in the race, of which three were UCI WorldTour teams, seven were UCI Professional Continental teams, and two were UCI Continental Teams. Each team could enter up to seven riders; however,  and  entered only six, and  entered only five, meaning the race began with a peloton of 80 riders. Of these riders, 54 finished, 12 finished but were over the time limit, and 14 did not finish.

UCI WorldTeams

 
 
 

UCI Professional Continental Teams

 
 
 
 
 
 
 

UCI Continental Teams

Results

References 

2019 Mont Ventoux Dénivelé Challenge
Mont Ventoux Dénivelé Challenge
Mont Ventoux Dénivelé Challenge
Mont Ventoux Dénivelé Challenge